is a railway station on the Ainokaze Toyama Railway Line in the city of Namerikawa, Toyama Prefecture, Japan, operated by the third-sector railway operator Ainokaze Toyama Railway.

Lines

Station layout 
Higashi-Namerikawa Station has two opposed ground-level side platforms connected by a level crossing. The station is unattended.

Platforms

History
Higashi-Namerikawa Station opened on 20 November 1964 as a station on the Japanese National Railways (JNR). It was privatized on 1 April 1984, becoming a station on JR West.

From this date, Higashi-Namerikawa Station was transferred to the ownership of the third-sector operating company Ainokaze Toyama Railway

Adjacent stations

Passenger statistics
In fiscal 2015, the station was used by an average of 154 passengers daily (boarding passengers only).

Surrounding area 
  on the Toyama Chiho Railway

See also
 List of railway stations in Japan

References

External links

  

Railway stations in Toyama Prefecture
Railway stations in Japan opened in 1964
Ainokaze Toyama Railway Line